Tony James may refer to:

Tony James (chemist) (born 1964), professor of chemistry
Tony James (English footballer) (born 1967), English footballer
Tony James (Welsh footballer, born 1919) (1919–1981), Welsh footballer
Tony James (Welsh footballer, born 1978), Welsh footballer
Tony James (musician) (born 1953), English pop musician
Tony James (cyclist) (born 1955), British cyclist
Hamilton E. James (born 1951), known as Tony James, president of Blackstone

See also
Anthony James (disambiguation)
Antonio James (disambiguation)